This article provides a list of Honda facilities. Honda's first factory was located in Japan which was completed in 1954.

Facilities

Japan
 Hamamatsu, Shizuoka 
 The Hamamatsu location was Honda's first factory, and production of motorcycles began April 1954 with production being transferred to the Kumamoto Factory in 2009. The factory currently produces automatic and CVT transmissions & BF20 and BF250 series outboard motors. It attained the international ISO14001 environmental management system certification on March 6, 1998.
 Suzuka, Mie 
 The Suzuka factory is Honda's second factory, and began operations April 1960. It originally produced the Honda Super Cub, followed by the Honda TN360, Honda S500, Honda 1300, Honda N360, Honda Civic, the scooters called Honda Roadpal and Honda Tact, the Honda City, Honda Integra, and the Honda Today. It currently builds the N-Box Slash, N-WGN, N-One, N-Box, N-Van, the Honda Shuttle, and the Honda Fit. The Suzuka Circuit is nearby, operated by Honda under the Mobilityland company, where the Japanese Grand Prix is held every year.
 Sayama, Saitama 
 The Saitama complex is Honda's third factory location, and consists of three factories; Sayama Automobile Plant, Ogawa Plant, and Yorii Automobile Plant. 
 Sayama began operations in 1964 building the Honda L700, and currently builds the Honda Stepwgn, Honda Odyssey (international), Honda Jade, Honda Legend, Honda Accord, Honda Freed, Honda CR-V, and the Honda Fit. The Sayama plant was closed in March 2022 after Honda announced its closure in 2017. Automobile production from Sayama will be consolidated into the Yorii Automobile Plant.
 Ogawa is an engine plant that provides for the Yorii Automobile plant.
 Yorii began operations in 2013 and builds the Honda Vezel, Honda Fit, Honda Grace, and the Honda Shuttle.
 Mooka, Tochigi 
 The Tochigi Plant is Honda's fourth factory, beginning operations December 1970 and builds powertrain components. In 1990 it exclusively built the Honda NSX. In 1992, the Tochigi plant combined the former Mooka, Takanezawa and Haga plants. The Twin Ring Motegi racing track, which Honda owns, is nearby.
 Kikuchi, Kumamoto 
 The Kumamoto is Honda's fifth factory which began producing motorcycles, ATVs since January 1976. Among the many motorcycles built here are the Honda Goldwing.
 Yokkaichi, Mie
 The Yachiyo Industry Co., Ltd. operates the Yokkaichi Factory, producing the Honda Acty truck and microvan as of August 1985. All commercial Kei truck for Japanese use as well as the Honda S660, and the Honda Life are built for Honda.
 All international Honda facilities

India
 Gurgaon, Haryana — Motorcycles & Scooters. 
 Noida, Uttar Pradesh — Vehicle R&D, Cars, SUVs & Power products. 
 Tapukara, Rajasthan — Motorcycles & Cars. 
 Tapukara, Rajasthan — Powertrain. 
 Narsapura, Karnataka — 2 Wheelers
 Vithalpur, Gujarat — Scooters.

United States

 Lincoln, Alabama — Odyssey, Pilot, Ridgeline, V6 engines, Accord V-6 (2009–10), Acura MDX, Passport (from 2019).
 Colton, California —  Training facility. 
 East Liberty, Ohio — Civic Sedan/GX (up to 2009), Element (up to 2011), CR-V (from 2006), Acura CL (1997–1999), Acura RDX (from 2011), Acura MDX (from 2017).
 Marysville, Ohio — Auto — Honda Accord Sedan/Coupe, Acura CL (2001–2003), Acura TL (up to 2014), Acura RDX (2006–11), Acura ILX (from 2015), Acura TLX, Honda CR-V (from 2018).
 Marysville, Ohio — Performance Manufacturing Center — Acura NSX (2016–2022), Acura MDX PMC Edition (2020), Acura TLX PMC Edition (2020), Acura RDX PMC Edition (2021–2022). 
 Marysville, Ohio — Motorcycle — Gold Wing 1100/1200/1500/1800, Valkyrie Rune, VTX 1300/1800, Shadow 1100, Valkyrie (GL1500C), motorcycle engines (Motorcycles are no longer made in USA). 
 Anna, Ohio — Engines. 
 Raymond, Ohio — Vehicle R&D.
 Russells Point, Ohio — Automatic transmissions, gears and four wheel drive components (about 10% of the plant's electricity is provided by two on-site wind turbines).
 Torrance, California — Vehicle R&D/design.
 Swepsonville, North Carolina — General purpose engines, Walk-behind lawn mowers, Snow blowers, String trimmers, Water pumps, and Tillers. 
 Greensboro, North Carolina — HondaJet.
 Burlington, North Carolina — GE Honda HF120 turbofan engine. 
 Greensburg, Indiana — Civic Sedan, Acura ILX (2012–14), CR-V, Insight (From 2019). 
 Timmonsville, South Carolina — All-terrain vehicles (ATVs) and (Side by Side (UTV)s); Four Trax Recon, Four Trax Foreman, Four Trax Rancher, Four Trax Rincon, Four Trax Rubicon, Sportrax 400EX/250EX, Pioneer 500, Pioneer 700, and Pioneer 1000.
 Tallapoosa, Georgia — Automatic transmissions.

Canada
 Alliston, Ontario — Plant 1: Civic (coupe and sedan - including all Si for North/South America); Plant 2:Honda CR-V; Civic engines are also produced in Alliston, starting 2013 Japanese CR-V will move to Canada replacing existing Acura MDX production.

Mexico
 El Salto, Jalisco — Engines, CR-V SUV (50,000 units per year). Honda CR-V stopped in 2016 and HR-V started in 2017.
 Celaya, Guanajuato — Cars, Honda HR-V and Honda Fit.

United Kingdom

 Swindon, England, UK — Civic SI (USA), Civic SiR (Canada), Civic Type-R, Type-S and standard (Europe, South Africa and Australia) as well as the Honda CR-V for Europe and Africa. 
 Honda Racing UK — based in Louth, Lincolnshire.

Belgium
 Aalst - Homologation Department.
 Ghent - European logistics.''

Bangladesh
  Munshiganj, Bangladesh — Motorcycles & Scooters  (Bangladesh Honda Private Limited).

Argentina
 Campana, Buenos Aires — Cars (Honda City); Motorcycles.
 Florencio Varela, Buenos Aires — Motorcycles (Honda Wave, Biz and Storm).

Brazil
 Manaus, Amazonas — Motorcycles. 
 Sumaré, São Paulo — Cars (Civic, City, HR-V and Fit).

China

 Guangzhou, Honda Automobile (China) Company — a joint venture with Guangzhou Automobile Industry Group; Honda Jazz for export. 
 Wuhan, Dongfeng Honda Automobile — a joint venture with Dongfeng Motor Corporation; Honda CRV for China market and engines for: CRV (2.0 and 2.4l), Civic (1.8l), Spirior (Acura TSX, Euro Accord 2.4l).

Colombia
 Cali, Valle del Cauca — Motorcycles.

Thailand
 Ayutthaya — Cars and petrol engines.  The Jazz, City, Civic 4D sedan (except Hybrid), Accord and CR-V for distribution throughout SE Asia and to Australia.

Turkey
 Gebze — Cars.

Malaysia
 Malacca — Cars (Honda Malaysia Sdn Bhd). 
 Penang — Motorcycle under Boon Siew Honda.

Indonesia

Automobiles
 Karawang, West Java (PT Honda Prospect Motor).

Motorcycle
 Cikarang, Bekasi, West Java (PT Astra Honda Motor). 
 Karawang, West Java (PT Astra Honda Motor). 
 Kelapa Gading, North Jakarta, Jakarta (PT Astra Honda Motor). 
 Sunter, North Jakarta, Jakarta (PT Astra Honda Motor).

Philippines
 Tanauan, Batangas — Motorcycles. 
 Santa Rosa City, Laguna — Cars; Parts and Transmission (to end production in March 2020).
 Valencia, Bukidnon — Motorcycles; Parts and Transmission.

Pakistan
 Lahore — Atlas Honda Cars (Pakistan) Limited; Manufacturing Cars. 
 Lahore — Atlas Honda Power Products (PVT) LTD; Importing & assembling Honda Power Products & Machinery Equipments.
 Lahore — Atlas Honda Limited; Manufacturing Motorcycles. 
 Karachi — Atlas Honda Limited; Manufacturing Motorcycles.

Taiwan
 Taipei — Honda Taiwan Co., Ltd; a wholly owned subsidiary of Honda Motor Co. Ltd. 
 Pingtung — Manufacturing plant producing CR-V, Accord, Civic, and Fit.

Vietnam
 Vĩnh Phúc — Car and motorcycle.

France
 Ormes, Loiret — Walk-behind lawn mowers, Generators, String trimmers.

Italy
 Atessa — Motorcycles, General purpose engines.

References